Zelena may refer to:
Zelena (Once Upon a Time)
 Zelena, Buchach Raion
 Zelena, Kovel Raion
 Zelena, Nadvirna Raion
 Zelena River, a river in Ukraine, a tributary of Inhulets River